The canton of Bethoncourt is an administrative division of the Doubs department, eastern France. It was created at the French canton reorganisation which came into effect in March 2015. Its seat is in Bethoncourt.

It consists of the following communes:
 
Allenjoie
Bethoncourt
Brognard
Dambenois
Étupes
Exincourt
Fesches-le-Châtel
Grand-Charmont
Nommay
Sochaux
Vieux-Charmont

References

Cantons of Doubs